Christian Uflacker (born August 4, 1985) is a Brazilian mixed martial artist and Brazilian Jiu-Jitsu practitioner. He holds a black belt under Carlos Gracie Jr. He is currently the head instructor at Uflacker Academy, in Chicago, Illinois.

Accomplishments 
1994-First Place in State Champion Tournament (Rio de Janeiro, Brazil)
1996-First Place in Brazilian National Champion Tournament, First Place in State Champion Tournament (Rio de Janeiro, Brazil)
1997-First Place in State Champion Tournament (Rio de Janeiro, Brazil)
1998-Third Place in Brazilian National Champion, First Place in State Champion Tournament (Rio de Janeiro, Brazil)
1999-First Place in Brazilian National Champion Tournament, First Place in State Champion (Rio de Janeiro, Brazil)
2000-First Place in Brazilian National Champion Tournament, First Place in State Champion Tournament (Rio de Janeiro, Brazil),Third Place in the World Tournament
2001-First Place in State Champion Tournament (Rio de Janeiro, Brazil)
2002-First Place in World Champion Tournament, First Place in Brazilian National Champion Tournament, First Place in National Teams Champion Tournament
2003-First Place in South American Tournament
2004-First Place in Challenge Champion Tournament (Brazil vs Argentina)
2005-Second place in Brazilian National Teams Tournament
2006-First Place in Europe Champion Tournament, NAGA Second place in open weight
2007-Third Place in Pan American Tournament
2007-First Place in USJJF American National Championships

Mixed martial arts record

|-
| Win
| align=center| 5–0
| Cliff Wright
| Technical Decision (unanimous)
| Bellator 84
| 
| align=center|  3
| align=center|  2:26
| Hammond, Indiana, United States
| 
|-
| Win
| align=center| 4–0
| LC Davis
| Decision (split)
| Hoosier Fight Club 10
| 
| align=center| 3
| align=center| 5:00
| Valparaiso, IN, United States
| 
|-
| Win
| align=center| 3–0
| Jonatas Novaes
| Decision (unanimous)
| Strikeforce: Fedor vs. Rogers
| 
| align=center| 3
| align=center| 5:00
| Hoffman Estates, Illinois, United States
| 
|-
| Win
| align=center| 2–0
| Mark Sinclair
| Submission (rear-naked choke)
| Total Fight Challenge 13
| 
| align=center| 1
| align=center| 1:22
| Hammond, Indiana, United States
| 
|-
| Win
| align=center| 1–0 
| Kori Trussell 
| Submission (rear-naked choke) 
| Total Fight Challenge 12 
|  
| align=center| 1 
| align=center| 2:20 
| Hammond, Indiana, United States
|

References

External links

Uflacker Academy
Renzo Gracie Chicago

1985 births
Brazilian expatriate sportspeople in the United States
Brazilian male mixed martial artists
Brazilian people of German descent
Brazilian practitioners of Brazilian jiu-jitsu
People awarded a black belt in Brazilian jiu-jitsu
Brazilian male judoka
Living people
Sportspeople from Chicago
Sportspeople from Rio de Janeiro (city)
Welterweight mixed martial artists
Mixed martial artists utilizing Brazilian jiu-jitsu
Mixed martial artists utilizing judo